Erasanthe is a genus of epiphytic orchids. It contains only one known species, Erasanthe henrici, endemic to Madagascar. Two subspecies are recognized:

Erasanthe henrici subsp. henrici
Erasanthe henrici subsp. isaloensis P.J.Cribb, Hermans & D.L.Roberts (synonym Aeranthes henrici var. isaloensis H.Perrier ex Hermans

References

IOSPE orchid photos, Erasanthe henrici

Monotypic Epidendroideae genera
Vandeae genera
Epiphytic orchids
Orchids of Madagascar
Angraecinae